Hastula apicitincta is a species of sea snail, a marine gastropod mollusc in the family Terebridae, the auger snails.

Description
The length of the shell varies between 15 mm and 22 mm.

Distribution
This marine species occurs off KwaZuluNatal, South Africa.

References

 Turton W.H. (1932). Marine Shells of Port Alfred, S. Africa. Humphrey Milford, London, xvi + 331 pp., 70 pls.
 Kilburn, R.N. & Rippey, E. (1982) Sea Shells of Southern Africa. Macmillan South Africa, Johannesburg, xi + 249 pp. page(s): 118
 Bratcher T. & Cernohorsky W.O. (1987). Living terebras of the world. A monograph of the recent Terebridae of the world. American Malacologists, Melbourne, Florida & Burlington, Massachusetts. 240pp.
 Steyn, D.G. & Lussi, M. (1998) Marine Shells of South Africa. An Illustrated Collector's Guide to Beached Shells. Ekogilde Publishers, Hartebeespoort, South Africa, ii + 264 pp.
 Terryn Y. (2007). Terebridae: A Collectors Guide. Conchbooks & NaturalArt. 59pp + plates.

External links
 
 Fedosov, A. E.; Malcolm, G.; Terryn, Y.; Gorson, J.; Modica, M. V.; Holford, M.; Puillandre, N. (2020). Phylogenetic classification of the family Terebridae (Neogastropoda: Conoidea). Journal of Molluscan Studies. 85(4): 359-388

Terebridae
Gastropods described in 1900